The 1960–61 Ohio Bobcats men's basketball team represented Ohio University as a member of the Mid-American Conference in the college basketball season of 1960–61. The team was coached by Jim Snyder and for the first time played their home games at the recently constructed Grover Center. The Bobcats finished the regular season with a record of 17–6 and won MAC regular season title with a conference record of 10–2. They received a bid to the NCAA tournament. There they lost to Louisville in the First Round.

Schedule

|-
!colspan=9 style=| Regular Season

|-

|-
!colspan=9 style=| NCAA Tournament

Source:

Statistics

Team Statistics
Final 1960–61 Statistics

Source

Player statistics

Source

References

Ohio Bobcats men's basketball seasons
Ohio
Ohio
Ohio Bobcats men's basketball
Ohio Bobcats men's basketball